Osman Murat Özaydınlı (22 May 1954 in Istanbul, Turkey) is a businessman, mechanical engineer and former vice-president of Turkish sport club Fenerbahçe SK. He received  his B.A. in from University of Bradford by Mechanical engineering and then followed by his Master's degree from University of Leeds by Industrial engineering.

On 29 July 2011 Özaydınlı was taken into custody over allegations of several cases of player manipulation.

Personal life
He is son of Army General İrfan Özaydınlı who was Minister of the Interior between (5 January 1978 - 2 January 1979) in Turkey.

External links 
 Fenerbahçe official website presidents page

References 

1954 births
Living people
Alumni of the University of Bradford
Alumni of the University of Leeds
Fenerbahçe S.K. board members
Turkish businesspeople
Turkish mechanical engineers